Wilhelm G. Solheim I (1898–1978) was a botanist after whom the Wilhelm G. Solheim Mycological Herbarium at the University of Wyoming is named.  His son, Wilhelm G. Solheim II was an archeologist and a senior practitioner of archaeology in Southeast Asia.

Sources 

1898 births
1978 deaths
People from Wyoming
20th-century American botanists